The General Service Medal is a service medal of Malaysia. It is awarded for general service to members of the military and uniformed services of Malaysia. It ranks 26th in the order of wear of the Orders, decorations, and medals of Malaysia.

Criteria
The General Service Medal is awarded to members of the Malaysian Armed Forces and Uniformed Services in acknowledgement and recognition of long service and good conduct.

Appearance
The General Service Medal is round  in diameter and made of silver. The obverse of the medal bears the Coat of arms of Malaysia. The reverse is inscribed with the words KERANA PERKHIDMATAN AM (For General Service) within a wreath of laurel leaves. The medal hangs from a red ribbon with a centre yellow stripe. On each side of the yellow stripe are black and white stripes.

References

Military awards and decorations of Malaysia
Awards established in 1960
1960 establishments in Malaya